The Cal 25 is an American trailerable sailboat, that was designed by C. William Lapworth and first built in 1965.

Production
The boat was built by Jensen Marine/Cal Yachts in the United States between 1965 and 1976, and also by Calgan Marine under license in North Vancouver, British Columbia, Canada, but it is now out of production. The company built 1,848 examples of the design during its 11 year production run.

Design

The Cal 25 is a small recreational keelboat, built predominantly of fiberglass, with wood trim. It has a masthead sloop rig, an internally-mounted spade-type rudder and a fixed fin keel. It displaces  and carries  of lead ballast.

The boat is normally fitted with a small outboard motor for docking and maneuvering.

The boat has a PHRF racing average handicap of 219 with a high of 213 and low of 228.

Operational history

In a 2010 review Steve Henkel wrote, "the Cal 25 ... is stable in a blow, has a cockpit big enough to sail four and drink six, and will sleep a friendly group of four or even five souls. (One couple and their two young children completely rebuilt an old Cal 25 and then circumnavigated the world in her.) All Cal 25s are old, but they were very popular so lots of them are still around, and many are relatively inexpensive ... Best features: With a cast lead keel of 1,700 pounds, the Cal 25 ... is quite stiff in heavy air. It's a good first boat for folks who are handy with tools and want a boat that sails well and is forgiving. Worst features: The 4-foot draft means she is not convenient to launch on a ramp from a trailer, unless the ramp is steep and you can rig a tongue extension on the trailer."

See also

List of sailing boat types

Related development
Cal 27

Similar sailboats
Beachcomber 25
Bayfield 25
Bombardier 7.6
C&C 25
Catalina 25
Catalina 250
Capri 25
Com-Pac 25
Dufour 1800
Freedom 25
Hunter 25.5
Jouët 760
Kelt 7.6
Kirby 25
MacGregor 25
Merit 25
Mirage 25
Northern 25
O'Day 25
Outlaw 26
Redline 25
Sirius 26
Tanzer 25
Tanzer 7.5
US Yachts US 25
Watkins 25

References

External links

Keelboats
1960s sailboat type designs
Sailing yachts
Trailer sailers
Sailboat type designs by Bill Lapworth
Sailboat types built by Cal Yachts
Sailboat types built by Calgan Marine